James Mathers (born May 5, 1955) is an American cinematographer and director of photography.  He is the younger brother of former child television star Jerry Mathers of Leave It to Beaver fame.

Biography
Mathers was born in Los Angeles, California, and appeared under the name "Jimmy Mathers" in several TV and film productions between 1961 and 1968.  His most memorable performance was in an episode of the TV comedy series Bewitched in 1964, when he played the role of an introverted boy who is afraid to play on the baseball team because of his overprotective mother.

Mathers attended film school and held a variety of staff and freelance assignments in film production.  He then specialized in cinematography and founded two film production companies, The Migrant FilmWorkers and Jim Mathers Film Company.

Mathers has been the director of photography on over 30 feature and made-for-TV films and has been associated with six TV series from inception through the show's first season.
He is the president and co-founder of the nonprofit educational cooperative "The Digital Cinema Society," a group dedicated to the industry's informed integration of new technology.

Career

The Darkness .... Edward "Eddie" Shrote / ... (Video game, 2007)
Adam-12 .... (2 episodes, 1968)
 Log 61: The Runaway .... Rick
 Log 161: And You Want Me to Get Married? ... Jimmy D'Angelo

My Three Sons .... Norman (1 episode, 1966)
 The State vs. Chip Douglas

O.K. Crackerby! .... Eddie Malone (1 episode, 1965)
 The Griffin Story

The Munsters .... The 2nd Boy (1 episode, 1965)
 Bats of a Feather

Bewitched .... Marshall Burns (1 episode, 1964)
 "Little Pitchers Have Big Fears"

The New Interns (1964) .... Freddie
Mail Order Bride (1964) .... Matt Boley
Wagon Train .... Oldest Hooper Orphan (Season 6, episode 26, 1963)
 "The Michael McGoo Story"
Summer Magic (1963) .... Peter Carey
Ichabod and Me .... Benjie Major (5 episodes)
 Benjie's Pageant (1962)
 Benjie's Indian (1962)
 The Phipps Papers (1962)
 Teenage Journalist (1961)
 Benjie's Spots (1961)

References

External links
 
 
  The Migrant FilmWorkers Official Website

American male child actors
American cinematographers
Living people
1955 births
20th-century American male actors
Male actors from Los Angeles
American male film actors
American male television actors